The 2011 Pan American Women's Handball Championship was the eleventh edition of the Pan American Women's Handball Championship, held from 28 June to 2 July 2011, in São Bernardo do Campo, Brazil. The tournament also served as the qualification event for the 2011 World Women's Handball Championship, with the top three teams winning the right to participate on the World Championship. However, since Pan American Championship winners Brazil already qualified as the host nation, fourth placed Uruguay was awarded the third spot, that was reserved for the zone.

Participating teams

Qualification
Cuba, Venezuela and the United States played a qualification tournament at Havana, Cuba to determine the last 2 participating nations.

Standings

Teams

Preliminary round
All times are local (UTC−3).

Group A

Group B

Placement matches

Seventh place game

Fifth place game

Final round

Semifinals

Third place game

Gold medal game

Final standing

References

External links
Results at todor66.com
Official website
Pan american handball site

American Women's Handball Championship
American Women's Handball Championship
Pan American Women's Handball Championships
Pan
São Bernardo do Campo
2011 in Brazilian women's sport
June 2011 sports events in South America
July 2011 sports events in South America